Gardez Airport  is a public use airport located near Gardez, Paktia, Afghanistan.

See also
List of airports in Afghanistan

References

External links 
 Airport record for Gardez Airport at Landings.com.

Airports in Afghanistan
Paktia Province